Typhonium is a genus in the family Araceae native to eastern and southern Asia, New Guinea, and Australia. It is most often found growing in wooded areas.

Species
Typhonium acetosella Gagnep. - Cambodia, Laos, Thailand, Vietnam
Typhonium adnatum Hett. & Sookch. - Thailand
Typhonium albidinervium C.Z.Tang & H.Li - Guangdong, Hainan, Laos, Thailand
Typhonium albispathum Bogner - Thailand
Typhonium alismifolium F.Muell. - Queensland, Northern Territory
Typhonium angustilobum F.Muell. - Queensland, New Guinea
Typhonium bachmaense V.D.Nguyen & Hett. - Vietnam
Typhonium baoshanense Z.L.Dao & H.Li - Yunnan
Typhonium blumei Nicolson & Sivad. - Japan, Taiwan, Ryukyu Islands, much of China, Bangladesh, Laos, Cambodia, Myanmar, Thailand, Vietnam; naturalized in Madagascar, Mauritius, Comoros, Borneo, Philippines, West Indies
Typhonium bognerianum J.Murata & Sookch. - Thailand
Typhonium brownii Schott - Queensland, New South Wales
Typhonium bulbiferum Dalzell - southern India
Typhonium circinnatum Hett. & J.Mood - Vietnam
Typhonium cochleare A.Hay - Northern Territory of Australia
Typhonium cordifolium S.Y.Hu - Thailand
Typhonium digitatum Hett. & Sookch. - Thailand
Typhonium echinulatum Hett. & Sookch. - Thailand
Typhonium eliosurum (F.Muell. ex Benth.) O.D.Evans - New South Wales
Typhonium filiforme Ridl. - Thailand, Malaysia
Typhonium flagelliforme (G.Lodd.) Blume - Guangdong, Guangxi, Yunnan, Bangladesh, Bhutan, Cambodia, India, Indonesia, Laos, Malaysia, Myanmar, Philippines, Singapore, Sri Lanka, Thailand, New Guinea, Queensland, Northern Territory
Typhonium fultum Ridl. - Thailand, Malaysia
Typhonium gagnepainii J.Murata & Sookch. - Thailand, Cambodia
Typhonium gallowayi Hett. & Sookch. - Thailand
Typhonium glaucum Hett. & Sookch. - Thailand
Typhonium griseum Hett. & Sookch. - Thailand
Typhonium hayatae Sriboonma & J.Murata - Vietnam
Typhonium huense Nguyen & Croat - Vietnam
Typhonium hunanense H.Li & Z.Q.Liu - Hunan
Typhonium inopinatum Prain - India, Myanmar, Thailand
Typhonium jinpingense Z.L.Wang, H.Li & F.H.Bian - Yunnan
Typhonium johnsonianum A.Hay & S.M.Taylor - Northern Territory of Australia
Typhonium jonesii A.Hay - Northern Territory of Australia
Typhonium laoticum Gagnep. - Thailand, Laos
Typhonium liliifolium F.Muell. ex Schott - Northern Territory, Western Australia
Typhonium lineare Hett. & V.D.Nguyen - Vietnam
Typhonium listeri Prain  - Assam, Bangladesh, Myanmar
Typhonium medusae Hett. & Sookch. - Thailand
Typhonium mirabile (A.Hay) A.Hay - Melville Island of Australia
Typhonium neogracile J.Murata - Assam, Bangladesh, Myanmar
Typhonium nudibaccatum A.Hay - Western Australia
Typhonium orbifolium Hett. & Sookch. - Thailand
Typhonium pedatisectum Gage - Myanmar
Typhonium pedunculatum Hett. & Sookch. - Thailand
Typhonium peltandroides A.Hay, M.D.Barrett & R.L.Barrett - Western Australia
Typhonium penicillatum V.D.Nguyen & Hett. - Vietnam
Typhonium pottingeri Prain - Myanmar
Typhonium praecox J.Murata - Myanmar
Typhonium praetermissum A.Hay - Northern Territory of Australia
Typhonium pusillum Sookch., V.D.Nguyen & Hett. - Thailand
Typhonium reflexum Hett. & Sookch. - Thailand
Typhonium roxburghii Schott - Taiwan, Yunnan, Bonin Islands, India, Bangladesh, Sri Lanka, Andaman Islands, Thailand, Malaysia, western Indonesia, Philippines, New Guinea; naturalized in Western Australia, eastern Brazil, Tanzania
Typhonium russell-smithii A.Hay - Northern Territory of Australia
Typhonium sagittariifolium Gagnep. - Thailand
Typhonium saraburiensis Sookch., Hett. & J.Murata - Thailand
Typhonium sinhabaedyae Hett. & A.Galloway - Thailand
Typhonium smitinandii Sookch. & J.Murata - Thailand
Typhonium stigmatilobatum V.D.Nguyen - Vietnam
Typhonium subglobosum Hett. & Sookch. - Thailand
Typhonium taylorii A.Hay - Northern Territory of Australia
Typhonium trifoliatum F.T.Wang & H.S.Lo ex H.Li, Y.Shiao & S.L.Tseng - Mongolia, Hebei, Inner Mongolia, Shaanxi, Shanxi
Typhonium trilobatum (L.) Schott - southern China, Indian Subcontinent, Indochina; naturalized in Windward Islands, Ivory Coast, Borneo, Philippines
Typhonium tubispathum Hett. & A.Galloway - Thailand
Typhonium varians Hett. & Sookch. - Thailand
Typhonium vermiforme V.D.Nguyen & Croat - Vietnam
Typhonium violifolium Gagnep . - Myanmar, Thailand
Typhonium watanabei J.Murata, Sookch. & Hett. - Thailand
Typhonium weipanum A.Hay - Queensland
Typhonium wilbertii A.Hay - Queensland

References

 
Araceae genera